Patrice Douglas (born Patrice Raye Dills) is an American Republican politician from the U.S. state of Oklahoma. Patrice Douglas was appointed by Governor Mary Fallin to fill the vacancy created when Commissioner Jeff Cloud from the Oklahoma Corporation Commission in September 2011. In 2012, she was elected without opposition to complete the term of office created by Jeff Cloud's resignation. Instead of running for re-election in 2014 for her seat on the OCC, she ran for the U.S. House seat in Oklahoma's 5th congressional district, losing to Steve Russell in the primary.

Early life and education
Born and raised in Oklahoma City, Douglas graduated from Putnam City North High School and earned a Bachelor of Science degree from the Oklahoma Christian University College of Business in 1983 and a juris doctor from the University of Oklahoma College of Law.

Career
Upon graduation from law school, she worked in her father's construction company before going to work in banking.

In 2009, she was elected the mayor of Edmond, Oklahoma and was re-elected in 2011 without opposition. She ran for Congress in 2014 but lost to Steve Russell, giving up her Corporation Commission seat in the process.

In March 2015, Douglas was hired as President of Emerging Markets at Premier Consulting Partners in Tulsa, Oklahoma. She is on the board of Bank SNB.

In June 2016, she was appointed Chief Executive Officer of the Oklahoma Tobacco Settlement Endowment Trust 
at a salary of $250,000.00, earning over $100,000.00 more than the Governor of the State of Oklahoma.  She later declined the appointment.

Personal life
She is married to Brent Douglas and they have two sons.

See also
 List of mayors of Edmond, Oklahoma

References

External links
Patrice Douglas' official biography

Year of birth missing (living people)
Living people
Corporation Commissioners of Oklahoma
Women mayors of places in Oklahoma
Oklahoma Republicans
Oklahoma Christian University alumni
Politicians from Oklahoma City
People from Edmond, Oklahoma
University of Oklahoma alumni
Women in Oklahoma politics
21st-century American women
Candidates in the 2014 United States elections